Jo(e) or Joseph Cornish may refer to:

Joe Cornish (born 1968), English comedian, broadcaster and film director
Joe Cornish (photographer) (born 1958), English landscape photographer
Jo Cornish, Australian newsreader
Joseph Cornish, American politician